= Club Brugge G-ploeg =

Belgian disability football club

Club Brugge G-Ploeg
- Full name: Club Brugge G-Ploeg Recreas
- Nickname: Club Brugge
- Founded: 2006
- Ground: Jan Breydel Stadium (Field 2)
- Owner: Club Brugge
- Website: https://www.clubbrugge.be/nl/foundation/projecten/sportief/g-ploeg
Home colours

Club Brugge G-Ploeg Recreas is a Belgian disability football club. The team was founded in 2006 and they play their home games and practice on the training fields around the Jan Breydel Stadium.

== History ==
In 2006 Dirk Van Quaquebeke founded a football team that his two disabled sons could participate in. Club Brugge picked up on the idea and supported the newly found club with the Club Brugge Foundation, becoming one of the first clubs in the world to do so.

The G-team doesn't play in a traditional football competition. Instead they play friendlies against other Belgian Pro League and local G-teams. Brugge also partake in disability football tournaments, and organise one annually.
